The 2020 San Diego City Attorney election is scheduled for Tuesday, November 3, 2020. The primary election was held on Tuesday, March 3, 2020.

Municipal elections in California are officially non-partisan, although most members do identify a party preference. A two-round system was used for the election, starting with a primary in March followed by a runoff in November between the top-two candidates. Incumbent City Attorney Mara Elliott advanced from the primary election to face private sector attorney Cory Briggs in the general election.

Campaign
The incumbent City Attorney Mara Elliott stood for reelection to a second term. She was challenged for the position by two private sector attorneys: Cory Briggs and Pete Mesich.

In the March primary, Elliott received about two-thirds of the vote to advance to the general election against Briggs, the closest runner up.

Polling

Primary Election

General Election

Results

Notes

References 

San Diego City Attorney
San Diego City Attorney elections